Aber railway station was a railway station on the North Wales Coast Line  in the Welsh county of Gwynedd. Although trains still pass on the main line the station closed in 1960.
A signal box on the site remained in use until the installation of colour light signalling.

History

The station had two platforms either side of a double track line, goods facilities included cattle pens and a siding for loading slate from the adjacent writing slate manufactory.

The station was host to a LMS caravan from 1934 to 1938 followed by four caravans in 1939. A camping coach was also positioned here by the London Midland Region from 1954 to 1959.

The station was closed by the British Transport Commission on 12 September 1960.

References

Bibliography

Further reading

External links 
 Pictures and plans of the station
 Station history and images at Disused Stations
 The station site after closure
 Station on navigable O. S. map

Former London and North Western Railway stations
Railway stations in Great Britain opened in 1848
Railway stations in Great Britain closed in 1960
Disused railway stations in Gwynedd
Abergwyngregyn
1848 establishments in Wales
1960 disestablishments in Wales